The 3rd Annual Latin American Music Awards were held at the Dolby Theatre in Los Angeles, California. It was broadcast live on Telemundo. Singers Becky G and Diego Boneta were announced as the hosts. Colombian singer-songwriter Shakira led the nominations with nine. American boy band CNCO and American singer-songwriter Prince Royce were the most awarded recipients with four each.

Nominees and Winners
The nominations were announced on September 19, 2017.

Multiple nominations and awards

References

External links 

 Official site in Facebook
 Official site in Instagram
 Official site in Twitter

2017 music awards
2017 in Latin music
2017 in Los Angeles